The Hispano-Suiza J12 is a luxury automobile that was made by Hispano-Suiza in France from 1931 to 1938.  It was the largest and most expensive car ever built by Hispano-Suiza. It replaced the Hispano-Suiza H6. The J12 was only available as a chassis, buyers having to arrange with an outside coachbuilder to integrate a body.

Hispano-Suiza suspended automobile production in 1938 to concentrate on the manufacture of aircraft engines.

Mechanical features

The J12 was powered by a 60° V12 engine with pushrod-operated overhead valves and a seven-bearing crankshaft. The engine initially displaced  with bore and stroke both being  and with a compression ratio of 5.0:1, delivered 220 hp at 3000 rpm. Two cars were fitted with long-stroke engines displacing  and delivering 250 hp, and several J12s were later upgraded to the larger engine.  Each engine block was machined from a single  billet. 

To demonstrate the high quality engineering and reliability of the J12, one car was driven from Paris to Nice and back without needing oil or water.

The J12 of the Spanish Head of State
In 1935 the Spanish Government placed an order for a J12 as ceremonial car for the President of the Republic. The body was to be a four-door convertible, built by Carrosserie Vanvooren of Paris. When the Spanish Civil War broke out in 1936, the bodied car was still in the French Hispano-Suiza plant, and in 1938 Miguel Mateu y Pla, one of the owners of the company, decided to deliver it to the Nationalists side. The car was then sent to the Fichet plant in Marseille to receive its armor plate and eventually delivered to the then new Spanish Government.  It was first used by their Head of State, General Franco, in the Victory parade held in Madrid in May 19th, 1939.

In 1952 this J12 was replaced by a Rolls-Royce Phantom IV. This was the only convertible out of the three Mulliner-bodied Phantom IV purchased by the Spanish Government; all of them are still in use in present days at the service of the Spanish royal family.

The J12 of the Shah Of Iran
Mohammad Reza Shah was given a J12 by his father in 1931 at the age of 12, right before taking part in Institut Le Rosey school in Switzerland.
Body was made by Paris-based body maker Carrosserie J. Saoutchik and used Swiss engineer Marc Birkigt's V12 engine.

Notes

References

J12
Vintage vehicles
1930s cars
Cars introduced in 1931